Rhinoliparis is a genus of snailfishes native to the northern Pacific Ocean.

Species
There are currently two recognized species in this genus:
 Rhinoliparis attenuatus Burke, 1912 (Slim snailfish)
 Rhinoliparis barbulifer C. H. Gilbert, 1896 (Longnose snailfish)

References

Liparidae